The 2010 Abierto Mexicano Telcel was a tennis tournament played on outdoor clay courts. It was the 17th edition of the men's tournament (10th for the women) of the Abierto Mexicano Telcel, and was part of the 500 series of the 2010 ATP World Tour, and was in the International category of tournaments on the 2010 WTA Tour. Both the men's and the women's events took place at the Fairmont Acapulco Princess in Acapulco, Mexico, from February 22 through February 27, 2010.

The men's singles draw included two-time defending champion Nicolás Almagro, Fernando Verdasco - the 2010 SAP Open champion; Juan Carlos Ferrero - the 2010 Brasil Open champion; Fernando González, a semifinalist in the 2010 Movistar Open; the 2010 Movistar Open finalists Thomaz Bellucci and Juan Mónaco; the 2010 Heineken Open champion John Isner and 2010 Medibank International Sydney runner-up Richard Gasquet.
 
The women's singles draw included the defending champion and seven-time Grand Slam champion Venus Williams, 2010 Open GDF Suez semifinalist Melanie Oudin, Gisela Dulko, Carla Suárez Navarro and Alizé Cornet.

ATP entrants

Seeds

Rankings as of February 15, 2010.

Other entrants
The following players received wildcards into the main draw:
 Santiago González
 Carlos Moyá
 Fernando Verdasco

The following players received entry from the qualifying draw:
 Victor Crivoi
 Diego Junqueira
 Alberto Martín
 Eduardo Schwank

WTA entrants

Seeds

Rankings as of February 15, 2010.

Other entrants
The following players received wildcards into the main draw:
 Sorana Cîrstea
 Zarina Diyas
 Alejandra Granillo

The following players received entry from the qualifying draw:
 Gréta Arn
 Catalina Castaño
 Lucie Hradecká
 Laura Pous Tió

Finals

Men's singles

 David Ferrer defeated  Juan Carlos Ferrero, 6–3, 3–6, 6–1
It was Ferrer's first title of the year and eighth of his career.

Women's singles

 Venus Williams defeated  Polona Hercog, 2–6, 6–2, 6–3
It was Williams' second title of the year and 43rd of her career. It was her second win at the event, defending her title from 2009.

Men's doubles

 Łukasz Kubot /  Oliver Marach defeated  Fabio Fognini /  Potito Starace, 6–0, 6–0

Women's doubles

 Polona Hercog /  Barbora Záhlavová-Strýcová defeated  Sara Errani /  Roberta Vinci, 2–6, 6–1, [10–2]

External links
 Official website

 
2010
Abierto Mexicano Telcel
Abierto Mexicano Telcel
Abierto Mexicano Telcel